The following is a list of notable companies associated with talent management systems (TMS).

TMS companies

Other companies that produce TMS

References

Human resource management consulting firms
Lists of service companies
Lists of companies by revenue
Talent and literary agencies